Kaltenbacher is a surname referring to one of several places named Kaltenbach. Notable people with this name include:

Barbara Kaltenbacher, Austrian mathematician
Bastien Kaltenbacher (better known as Bastian Baker, born 1991), Swiss singer/songwriter, brother of Marine
Joseph Kaltenbacher, founder of American leather product supplier Seton Company, Inc.
Marine Kaltenbacher, songwriter of Sister (S!sters song), sister of Bastien
Paul Kaltenbacher, one of the initial two people accused in the Zaubererjackl witch trials in 17th-century Salzburg
Philip D. Kaltenbacher (born 1937), American politician